Jane Alison (born 1961) is an Australian author.

Early life and education
Born in Canberra in 1961, Alison spent two years in Australia as a small child, growing up mainly in the United States as a child of diplomatic parents. She attended public schools in Washington, D.C., and then earned a B.A. in classics from Princeton University in 1983. Before writing fiction, she worked as an administrator for the National Endowment for the Humanities, as a production artist for the Washington City Paper, as an editor for the Miami New Times, and as a proposal and speech writer for Tulane University. She also worked as a freelance editor and illustrator before attending Columbia University to study creative writing.

Literary career
Alison's first novel, The Love-Artist, was published in 2001 by Farrar, Straus & Giroux and has been translated into seven languages. It was followed by The Marriage of the Sea, a New York Times Notable Book of 2003. Her latest novel, Natives and Exotics, appeared in 2005 and was one of that summer's recommended readings by Alan Cheuse of National Public Radio. Her short fiction and critical writing have recently appeared in Seed; Five Points; Postscript: Essays on Film and the Humanities; and The Germanic Review. She has also written several biographies for children and co-edited with Harold Bloom a critical series on women writers. She has taught writing and literature at Columbia University, Barnard College, Bryn Mawr College, and for writers groups in Geneva, Switzerland. She also participated in an on-line MOOC course for University of Virginia. Having lived in Karlsruhe, Germany for the past 10 years,  she recently moved to Miami, Florida, in 2007, and began teaching in the MFA Creative Writing program at the University of Miami.

Bibliography

Memoir
 The Sisters Antipodes,  (Houghton Mifflin Harcourt, 2009)

Fiction
 The Love-Artist: A Novel,  (Picador, 2002)
 The Marriage of the Sea,  (Farrar, Straus and Giroux; 1st edition, 2003)
 Natives and Exotics,  (Harvest Books; 1st edition, 2006)
 Nine Island,  (Catapult, 2016)

Criticism and other non-fiction
 Meander, Spiral, Explode: Design and Pattern in Narrative,  (Catapult, 2019)

References

External links 
 Jane Alison's Home Page
 Artfully as He Writes: New York Times review of The Love Artist
  Fluid Dynamics: New York Times review of The Marriage of the Sea
  Transplants: New York Times review of Natives and Exotics

21st-century Australian novelists
Australian memoirists
Australian women novelists
Living people
Princeton University alumni
Columbia University School of the Arts alumni
21st-century Australian women writers
Australian women memoirists
1961 births
21st-century memoirists